The 2020–21 AC Ajaccio season was the club's 111th season in existence and the eighth consecutive season in the second division of French football. In addition to the domestic league, Ajaccio participated in this season's edition of the Coupe de France. The season covered the period from 1 July 2020 to 30 June 2021.

Players

First-team squad
As of 15 January 2021.

Pre-season and friendlies

Competitions

Overview

Ligue 2

League table

Results summary

Results by round

Matches
The league fixtures were announced on 9 July 2020.

Coupe de France

References

External links

AC Ajaccio seasons
Ajaccio